"8 Letters" is a song performed by American boy band Why Don't We. The song was released as a digital download on August 19, 2018, by Signature and Atlantic Records as the third single from their eponymous debut studio album 8 Letters. The song peaked at number fourteen on the US Bubbling Under Hot 100 Singles chart. The track samples the drum break from The Detroit Emeralds' song "You're Getting a Little Too Smart"

Music video
A music video to accompany the release of "8 Letters" was first released onto YouTube on August 19, 2018. The video was directed by Éli Sokhn. The video shows the band frozen in time as they reflect on being incapable of opening up their hearts.

Awards and nominations

Track listing

Personnel
Credits adapted from Tidal. 
 The Monsters & Strangerz – Producer, programmer, recording
 Jonny Price – Additional Production, writer
 Nejeeb Jones – Assistant Mix Engineer
 James Abrahart – Background Vocals, writer
 Will Quinnell – Mastering Engineer
 Tony Maserati – Mixing Engineer
 R8DIO – Vocal Production
 Corbyn Besson – Vocals
 Daniel Seavey – Vocals
 Jack Avery – Vocals
 Jonah Marais – Vocals
 Zach Herron – Vocals
 Jordan K. Johnson – Writer
 Marcus Lomax – Writer
 Stefan Johnson – Writer

Charts

Certifications

Release history

References

2018 songs
Songs written by James Abrahart
Songs written by Jordan Johnson (songwriter)
Songs written by Marcus Lomax
Songs written by Stefan Johnson